William Hudson Dudney (8 January 1860 – 16 June 1922) was an English cricketer active from 1883 to 1893 who played for Canterbury in New Zealand and Sussex in England. He was born in Brighton and died in Hove. He appeared in 36 first-class matches as a right-handed batsman and wicketkeeper.

Dudney was educated at Cranleigh School before spending a southern summer in New Zealand. Arriving in spring 1883, he played as a batsman for Canterbury in the 1883-84 season, when he was the highest-scoring batsman in New Zealand, with 208 runs in six matches at an average of 18.90. He returned to England after the season. At his Christchurch club, Midland Canterbury, he was considered "one of the most brilliant and effective batsmen who has joined [the club] in many years", as well as a fine fieldsman.

He played irregularly for Sussex, mostly as a wicketkeeper-batsman, between 1887 and 1893. His highest score was 97, the highest score of the match, when Sussex followed on against Kent in 1887.

References

External links
 

1860 births
1922 deaths
People educated at Cranleigh School
English cricketers
Sussex cricketers
Canterbury cricketers
Non-international England cricketers